Virginia Association of Independent Schools (VAIS) is a non-profit, voluntary membership association of schools within the state of Virginia. The VAIS is a member of the National Association of Independent Schools. Prior to its establishment in Charlottesville, Virginia on April 30, 1973, a small number of independent schools’ headmasters known as “The Baker’s Dozen” met informally, teachers at their independent schools held conferences, and development coordinators hosted their own meetings to discuss commonly held educational issues. While the Virginia State Department of Education accredits independent and other  nonpublic pre-school, elementary and secondary schools via the Virginia Council for Private Education (VCPE), the VAIS is a service organization that promotes educational, ethical and professional excellence.

According to their website, "the stated purposes of the Association have been to promote the well-being of and public regard for independent schools in the Commonwealth of Virginia; to safeguard the interests of these schools in matters of legislation and regulation; to act as an evaluating and accrediting organization for independent schools in Virginia; to foster mutually beneficial relations with the Virginia State Department of Education and other educational agencies; to assist member schools in maintaining standards of excellence; to encourage activities and to exchange information about new methodologies and practices; and to provide community service and leadership."

Members of VAIS 
VAIS members are not only located all across the state, but also the list comprises all grade levels, and both secular and religious schools.

Hampton Roads 

Broadwater Academy, Exmore
Cape Charles Christian School, Cape Charles
Chesapeake Bay Academy, Virginia Beach
Christopher Academy, Portsmouth
Hampton Roads Academy, Newport News
Nansemond-Suffolk Academy, Suffolk
Norfolk Academy, Norfolk
Norfolk Christian Schools, Norfolk
Norfolk Collegiate School, Norfolk
Southampton Academy, Courtland
Strelitz International Academy, Virginia Beach
Tidewater Academy, Wakefield
Virginia Beach Friends School, Virginia Beach
The Williams School, Norfolk

Northern Virginia 

Alexandria Country Day School, Alexandria
Browne Academy, Alexandria
Burgundy Farm Country Day School, Rose Hill
Commonwealth Academy, Alexandria
Congressional School, Falls Church
Episcopal High School, Alexandria
Flint Hill School, Oakton
Gesher Jewish Day School, Fairfax
Grace Episcopal School, Alexandria
Green Hedges School, Vienna
The Langley School, McLean
Linton Hall School, Bristow
The Madeira School, McLean
Montessori School of Northern Virginia, Falls Church
The Potomac School, McLean
St. Stephen's & St. Agnes School, Alexandria
Trinity School at Meadow View, Falls Church
Westminster School, Annandale

Northwest Virginia 

Foxcroft School, Middleburg
Fredericksburg Academy, Fredericksburg
Highland School, Warrenton
The Hill School, Middleburg
Loudoun Country Day School, Leesburg
Middleburg Montessori School, Middleburg
Powhatan School, Boyce
Randolph-Macon Academy, Front Royal
Saint James' Episcopal School, Warrenton
Wakefield School, The Plains

Richmond 

Anna Julia Cooper School
Benedictine College Preparatory
Church Hill Academy
Collegiate School
Good Shepherd Episcopal School
Millwood School
The New Community School
Northstar Academy
Orchard House School
Richmond Montessori School
Riverside School
Rudlin Torah Academy
Sabot at Stony Point
St. Andrew's School
St. Catherine's School
St. Christopher's School
St. Michael's Episcopal School
The Steward School
Trinity Episcopal High School

The River

Aylett Country Day School, Bruington
Chesapeake Academy, Irvington
Christchurch School, Christchurch
St. Margaret's School, Tappahannock
Ware Academy, Gloucester

Southwest Virginia 

Boys Home of Virginia, Covington
Chatham Hall, Chatham
Community High School, Roanoke
Hargrave Military Academy, Chatham
James River Day School, Lynchburg
New Covenant Schools, Lynchburg
New Vistas School, Lynchburg
North Cross School, Roanoke
Oak Hill Academy, Mouth of Wilson
Sullins Academy, Bristol
Virginia Episcopal School, Lynchburg

Valley 

Blue Ridge School, St. George
The Covenant School, Charlottesville
Eastern Mennonite School, Harrisonburg
Field School of Charlottesville, Crozet
Fishburne Military School, Waynesboro
Fork Union Military Academy, Fork Union
Fuqua School, Farmville
Grymes Memorial School, Orange
The Miller School of Albemarle, Charlottesville
Mountaintop Montessori School, Charlottesville
St. Anne's-Belfield School, Charlottesville
Stuart Hall School, Staunton
Tandem Friends School, Charlottesville
Woodberry Forest School, Woodberry Forest

References

External links 
 Virginia Association of Independent Schools

Private and independent school organizations in the United States
United States schools associations
1973 establishments in Virginia